Fundo de Garantia do Tempo de Serviço (FGTS) is a fund created in order to protect workers in Brazil dismissed without just cause. By opening an account linked to the employment contract, employers deposit in accounts opened at the Caixa Econômica Federal, at the beginning of each month and in the name of the employees, the amount corresponding to 8% of each employee's gross salary. For employment contracts signed under the terms of law 11.180/05 (Apprenticeship Contract), the percentage is reduced to 2%, and finally, in the case of domestic workers, the collection corresponds to 11.2%, being 8% as a monthly deposit and 3.2% as an anticipation of the rescissory collection.

It was created during the military dictatorship by a law promulgated on September 13, 1966, by the then President Castelo Branco. At the time, with Octávio Gouveia de Bulhões in the Ministry of Finance and Roberto Campos in charge of Planning, the creation of the FGTS was part of the institutional reforms and economic adjustment prepared by the holders of the portfolios after Institutional Act 1. It is currently regulated by Law No. 8.036 and Decree No. 99.684 of 1990.

History 
Until September 13 of 1966, the date of creation of the FGTS, there was only one employment guarantee to the worker: the decennial stability. It occurred when the employee completed 10 years of work at a company, occasion on which he became stable. After the acquired stability, his employment contract could only be terminated if he incurred just cause, even then after verification of the serious misconduct through an investigation that verified the accusation. If the employee asked to be fired, his request would only be valid when made with the assistance of the Union, or the Labor Ministry, or even the Labor Court.

In this stability system, employees with more than a year of service and who were dismissed before completing the ten-year period were entitled to an indemnity corresponding to one month's salary for each year worked. After 10 years of service, in order to give substance to the guarantee of stability, this indemnity had its value doubled.

In order to cover this indemnity, some companies, on their own account, accrued about 1/12th of the value of the worker's salary in order to have the necessary amount to cover this cost in case it was necessary to fire the worker. Many companies understood that even if they accrued some amount, the Indemnity would still be extremely high. For this reason, not all employers were prepared. Thus, in practice, many workers were fired shortly before the completion of the ten-year period or did not receive a severance pay they were entitled to, and were forced to claim their rights in court.

The Decennial Stability was considered an onerous burden for the companies, since, according to entrepreneurs, it didn't add value to society as a whole. As the years went by, the government also verified that the stability regime didn't favor the employees, since the companies didn't allow the worker to fulfill the necessary ten years. The solution found was to adopt the regime of the Length-of-Service Guarantee Fund – FGTS – inserted into the legal world by Law No. 5.107.

The new regime, which did not do away with the previous system, was an alternative to the ten-year stability regime. Employees could opt for the new regime or remain in the previous one. To do so, employers had to mention in the employee's Employment Record Card whether or not they were opting for the FGTS.

With the new law a fund was created, supplied by the employers, through the deposit of 8% on the worker's remuneration, required throughout the term of the contract. Regardless of the employee's option, the employer had the obligation to deposit the FGTS value in a specific account, in the name of the worker as "not opting".

The ten-year stability regime ceased to exist for workers in general as of the effectiveness of the Federal Constitution. For this reason, Law 5.107 was revoked by law 7.839, of 1989, which also established rules for employees who, at the time of the effectiveness of the Constitution, were not opting for the FGTS system. Law 7.839/89 was later revoked by law 8.036/90, which currently regulates the FGTS system.

The FGTS resources were, and are, remunerated with low interest rates and monetary correction, and were originally used to finance investments in housing and infrastructure, especially sanitation.

With the promulgation of the Brazilian Constitution, the job stability for employees under the Consolidation of Labor Laws (CLT) was extinguished, and only those who had worked for 10 years in the same company remained stable. From that point on, all workers with permanent employment contracts were obliged to opt for the FGTS.

Criticism 
Among the most common criticisms of the fund is the fact that its yield is lower than applications such as savings accounts, the fund's account is not adjusted by the official inflation index, the Extended National Consumer Price Index (IPCA), but by the Referential Rate (TR). The remuneration rule was changed by MP 889/19, making the FGTS start to yield more than savings or CD.

In December 2016, the then Minister of Finance, Henrique Meirelles, confirmed that the government is studying to allow the use of FGTS to pay debts. The measure was not well received by Proteste, the largest consumer organization in Latin America, since it could further complicate the situation of consumers, especially those who are already in debt.

In 2017 President Michel Temer signed a decree allowing withdrawals of the FGTS, but only from inactive accounts. According to information from Caixa Econômica Federal, 88% of the amount eligible for withdrawal has been exercised. The conclusion of economist Cecilia Machado is that the worker does not want to keep his money in the FGTS account: "It is not known whether the withdrawal occurs because this is a savings that the worker would not like to do or if the withdrawals are justified by the low rate of return of the FGTS. (...) [But the FGTS] is an imposing instrument of the government, which cannot be chosen by the worker, constituting a mechanism of financial repression.".

Certification 
The Negative Certificate attests to the regular situation of employers in relation to the collection of the Length-of-Service Guarantee Fund. The Negative Certificate is only granted to a company when it is up to date with all its labor obligations.

The Regularity Certificate (CRF) is a document issued by the Caixa Econômica Federal. The CRF is required to withdraw from inactive accounts, to prove the non-existence of an employment relationship, and to prove that a certain taxpayer has no pending issues related to the benefit. It serves to attest that a company is up to date with its employees' payments and also with Social Security. The document is a mandatory requirement for companies that participate in biddings, close contracts with the government, or even undertake the purchase and sale of real estate, estate, and public tenders. The document can also be requested in case of a tax audit by the Ministry of Labor.

References

External links 
 Official website of the Guarantee Fund
 Caixa Econômica Federal - FGTS FAQs

Brazilian labour law
1966 establishments in Brazil